This is a list of episodes for Deadliest Warrior.

Shortly after the season 2 finale, season 3 was announced on Spike.com, followed shortly after by a live Aftermath featuring new host Richard "Mack" Machowicz answering fan questions. On October 13 the show announced the start of production for the season.  Over the course of several weeks, Spike revealed the Season 3 match ups. The battle simulator (created by host Max Gieger) now simulates 5,000 battles as opposed to the previous 1,000. The new format (except for Vampires vs. Zombies) is a squad on squad battle of 5 vs. 5 (reserved only for modern matches in past seasons). An average of 100 different X-factors are now factored into each simulation, each being rated on a scale from 1 to 100 (though only a few are mentioned). Season 3 premiered on July 20, 2011, at 10 pm EDT.

Episode 23: George Washington vs. Napoleon Bonaparte

George Washington Team: Paul Suda (18th Century Weapons Expert), Wayne Lee, PhD (Professor of Military History)
George Washington Weapons: Colichemarde Sword, Brown Bess Flintlock Musket & Pennsylvania Long Rifle, 6 Pound Cannon
George Washington Tactics: Hybrid Warfare
George Washington Statistics: Circa: 1781, Age: 49, Height: 6 Feet 3 Inches, Weight: 200 Pounds

Napoleon Bonaparte Team: Mathew Cape (19th Century Weapons Expert), Phillipe Simon (Napoleonic Historian)
Napoleon Bonaparte Weapons: Cavalry Saber, 1777 Charleville Musket, 8 Pound Cannon
Napoleon Bonaparte Tactics: "Bait and Bash"
Napoleon Bonaparte Statistics: Circa: 1805, Age: 37, Height: 5 Feet 6 Inches, Weight: 140 Pounds

This is the first episode to test cannons.
For short-range weapons, the French cavalry saber was tested against the Colichemarde sword in eliminating three targets from horseback and on foot. Although both blades were evenly match with three kills and the cavalry saber had flexibility, the edge was given to the Colichemarde sword since it was optimized for dismounted and anti-saber combat.
For mid-range weapons, two four-man squads, one armed with four 1777 Charleville muskets and one armed with two Brown Bess muskets and two Pennsylvania Long Rifles, were tested against each other in eliminating four infantry and one mounted officer with five bullets each. The French squad eliminated only four infantry in 1 minute 43 seconds while the American squad eliminated all five targets and the simulated horse in 3 minutes 31 seconds. Although it was very slow to reload, the edge was given to the Pennsylvania Long Rifle for its greater range and accuracy.
For long-range weapons, the French 8-pounder cannon was tested against the American 6-pounder cannon in eliminating 6 targets and 1 cannon at 200 yards. The French 8-pounder achieved three kills and destroyed one cannon while the American 6-pounder achieved only two kills and destroyed one cannon. In the Anti-Personnel Munition test, the French 8-Pounder achieved an 8/15 kill ratio with its Grapeshot while the American 6-pounder achieved only a 4/15 kill ratio with its scattershot. The edge was given to the French 8-pounder for its firepower and the better quality of its munitions and crew.
For military tactics, Washington's "Hybrid Warfare" strategy was compared to Napoleon's "Bait and Bash" strategy. Washington's Hybrid Warfare involved the use of hit-and-run guerrilla warfare to weaken the British Army and then use the Continental Army, to fight the conventional battles and sieges which successfully led to his greatest victory at the Battle of Yorktown. Napoleon's Bait and Bash involved luring an enemy into position and attacking when the conditions were perfect which was accomplished during his greatest victory at the Battle of Austerlitz where he deceived the Russo-Austrian army into thinking that he was planning to surrender by withdrawing from the Pratzen Heights and then used the cover of fog to mount a surprise attack on the weakened center of their lines. Napoleon's Bait and Bash was given the edge due to the magnitude of the French victory at Austerlitz; Washington could not have won at Yorktown without his French allies.
The example of George Washington and Napoleon's victorious battles were just 24 years apart, Yorktown being set in 1781 and Austerlitz in 1805.
George Washington is one of six warriors with no battle cry at the end, as an example of him being the "gentlemen soldier."
At 6' 3", George Washington is the tallest modern warrior.
Washington is the third most popular warrior on season 3.
George Washington is the first presidential warrior, with Teddy Roosevelt following episodes later.

Reenactment 23

The battle starts off with the Grande Armée climbing a hilltop, where Napoleon observes Washington's Continental Army relaxing near their cannon. Washington rides up and greets his troops and then notices Napoleon's troops watching them. Napoleon orders a charge as Washington's men take defensive positions and start firing. However, none of them hit their targets. One of Napoleon's men kills a Continental Soldier with his first shot, but one of Washington's men shortly follows with a hit of his own. Washington orders his sharpshooter to take out Napoleon's mounted lieutenant, which he does. Both sides then scramble for their cannons. Napoleon's army fires their cannon first and takes out another one of Washington's men, but a man of their own is decapitated as Washington's army fires their cannon. Another shot from Napoleon's cannon disables Washington's artillery. As Washington's men commence a charge, Napoleon hastily reloads and is able to fire Grapeshot from his cannon, which kills one of the chargers and knocks the other one down. Washington gets on his horse and charges towards Napoleon as his opponent does the same. Washington kills Napoleon's last man as he struggles to unsheathe his sword while Napoleon kills Washington's last man as he stumbles to his feet. Then the leaders charge at each other. The first blow knocks Washington off his horse. As he retrieves his hat, Napoleon dismounts and engages him. A brief clash of swords gives Washington an opening and he punches Bonaparte in the face, stunning him. They engage again and after a while, Washington gets the upper hand and with a thrust, pierces his sword into Napoleon's neck. As his opponent falls, Washington casually cleans his sword and gazes upon the horizon.

Winner: George Washington

Episode 24: Joan of Arc vs. William the Conqueror

Joan of Arc Team: Claire Dodin (15th Century Weapons Expert), Timothy Pickles (Military Historian)
Joan of Arc Weapons: French Arming Sword, Steel Crossbow, Siege Cannon
Joan of Arc Armor: Plate Armor
Joan of Arc Tactics: "Audacious Attack"
Joan of Arc Statistics: Circa: 1429 A.D., Age: 17, Height: 5 Feet 4 Inches, Weight: 125 Pounds

William the Conqueror Team: Jason McNeil (Medieval Combat Specialist), Stephen Morillo, PhD (Chair, Wabash College)
William the Conqueror Weapons: Norman Broadsword, Composite Crossbow, Torsion Catapult
William the Conqueror Armor: Chain Mail Hauberk
William the Conqueror Tactics: Feigned Retreat
William the Conqueror Statistics: Circa: 1066 A.D., Age: 38, Height: 5 Feet 10 Inches, Weight: 215 Pounds

This is the first co-ed episode, as well as the first episode to test siege engines.
For short-range weapons, the arming sword was tested against the Norman broadsword in eliminating four targets and damaging one special target wearing the opposing warrior's armor. The Arming sword, which allowed for half-swording techniques, achieved four kills and easily penetrated William's chainmail armor in 35s. The Norman broadsword achieved five kills in 21 seconds but could not penetrate Joan's plate armor. The edge was given to the Norman Broadsword for its better performance at thrusting and slashing.
For mid-range weapons, the Composite Crossbow was tested against the Steel Crossbow in eliminating three defenders. The Composite Crossbow scored a 3/9 hit ratio, a 1/6 kill ratio, and an Average Reload time of 20s while the Steel Crossbow scored a 6/9 hit ratio, a 4/6 kill ratio, and an Average Reload time of 57s. Even though it was very slow to reload, the edge was given to the Steel Crossbow for its better accuracy and longer range.
For long-range weapons, the 12-Pound Siege Cannon was tested against the Torsion catapult in a simulated castle siege. The Siege Cannon inflicted heavy damage on a wall with its first three shots and bored a large hole into a gel dummy with the fifth shot, despite missing it with the fourth. The average reload time was 1m and 24s. The Torsion Catapult fired rocks over a castle wall and scored a 3/5 kill ratio with an average reload time of 1m and 1s. The edge was given to the Siege Cannon for its intimidation factor and ability to actually breach a castle wall.
For armour, Joan's Full Plate was tested against William's chainmail hauberk in encumbrance and protection capability. Joan's Full Plate only reduced her mobility by 14% and deflected a blow from the Norman broadsword. In contrast, William's chainmail hauberk reduced his mobility by 27% and was easily pierced three times by the Arming sword. The edge was given to Joan's Full Plate as its durability and maneuverability were greater than William's chainmail hauberk.
For military tactics, Joan's "Audacity" was compared to William's "Feigned Retreat". During the Siege of Orleans (1428–1429), Joan snuck some of her forces into Orléans and then ordered them to regroup for a bold, frontal attack on the English Siege Post which succeeded in lifting the siege and saving Orléans from capitulation. At the Battle of Hastings in 1066, William's initial uphill attack was foiled by the Anglo-Saxon shield wall formation on top of a hill. By feigning retreats, he deceived them into breaking their shield wall formation and coming off the high ground which allowed his forces to inflict significant casualties on the pursuing English forces. With their ranks thinned out and their shield wall reduced in effectiveness, William ordered his archers to fire on the rear of the Anglo-Saxon army which succeeded in inflicting further casualties and mortally wounding king Harold Godwinson, clinching the victory for the Normans. The edge was given to William's "Feigned Retreat" for the greater tactical significance of his victory at Hastings.
This is the first ancient match-up that features warriors of the same region (France). However, William the Conqueror was Norman.
Joan of Arc is the only warrior whose historical death is shown.
This is the first ancient match to feature 5 on 5, as well as the first ancient match to have a counter to tell how many combatants are remaining on each side.
Joan of Arc is the second female to take part in the fight, the only female to lead a team, and the only female to survive the final battle (an innocent woman was gunned down in a fire fight between the Yakuza and Mafia, both female spies died in KGB vs. CIA, and all the female undead in Vampires vs. Zombies were killed).
This is the third of three episodes to have a warrior with at least one gunpowder-based weapon win over one who does not.
A bonus scene not shown in the original broadcast available at Spike.com showed two X-factors that went into the simulator, including "Logistics", in which Joan received a rating of 74 compared to William's rating of 72, and "Killer Instinct", in which William was rated 86 while Joan was rated 83.
Joan of Arc killed 3 combatants in the simulation, earning her the most kills out of any female warrior (the female KGB agent earned 2 kills).

Reenactment 24

Joan of Arc finishes a prayer to God and resumes her siege on William's castle, assisted by four French knights while William the Conqueror defends with four Norman soldiers. Two of the Norman soldiers (one on the ramparts and one in an arrow slit) fire their composite crossbows with both missing. The French knights fire their siege cannon, damaging the wall and killing the archer behind the arrow slit. William orders his men to load and fire the torsion catapult which rains down a rock and crushes one of the French knights. The siege cannon fires another shot which breaches the castle wall and also destroys the catapult as well as knocking down the Normans who were operating it. The Norman soldier on the ramparts shoots his crossbow but only hits a siege mantlet. One of the knights fires back with his steel crossbow and kills the crossbowman. A third Norman shoots Joan with his crossbow but the bolt is unable to penetrate her plate armour. Reloading, the third Norman takes out the crossbow knight who was with Joan with a fatal shot to the eye. Joan readies the crossbow that the killed knight had been loading, and shoots the third Norman soldier, killing him. As Joan and the remaining two knights enter the castle through the breach in the wall, William's fourth and last soldier kills a third knight with a slice to the face. Joan rushes up and stabs him in the neck with her arming sword. William now stands alone in his castle and readies himself with his shield and sword. Joan and her last knight charge up to William on two separate sets of stairs. The knight reaches the top first and William engages him. He disarms the knight who then desperately grabs and takes William's shield away. William stabs the unarmed knight with his broadsword and pushes the man off the wall, just as Joan reaches his position. William and Joan fight, with William using his physicality, size, and leverage to strike Joan in the chest. Her armour absorbs the blow from his blade and is dented, but it protects her as she backs down a few steps. Clashing swords again, William tries to swing his broadsword down from overhead. Joan uses her lower position on the stairs to thrust her sword twice through William's left leg. As he collapses, he makes one last effort to kill her, but Joan grabs his arm and sword, before stabbing him one more time, causing him to fall from the steps. With her enemy dead, Joan raises her sword and roared in victory.

Winner: Joan of Arc

Episode 25: U.S. Army Rangers vs. North Korean Special Ops

U.S. Army Ranger Team: Ssgt. Tim Kennedy (U.S. Army Ranger), Lt. Col. John Lock [ret] (U.S. Army Ranger/Historian)
U.S. Army Ranger Weapons: M4 Assault Rifle, SR-25 Sniper Rifle, Claymore Mine
U.S. Army Ranger Hand-To-Hand Combat: Special Operations Combatives Program
U.S. Army Ranger Statistics: Height: 5 Feet 9 Inches, Weight: 175 Pounds, Age: 24

North Korean Special Ops Team: Charles Joh (SWAT CDR/Tactics Specialist), Ji Jay Kim (Fmr South Korean Marine), Thomas Rix (Fmr U.S. Intelligence Officer), Grand Master Ho Jin Song (9th Degree Black Belt)
North Korean Special Ops Weapons: Type 68 AKM, PSL, Anti-Personnel Box Mine
North Korean Special Ops Hand-To-Hand Combat: Hapkido and Tae-Kwon-Do Hybrid
North Korean Special Ops Statistics: Height: 5 Feet 6 Inches, Weight: 135 Pounds, Age: 27

This is the first match-up which could potentially take place in real life due to the current relations between the two warriors' countries.
For mid-range weapons, the Type 68 was tested against the M4 Carbine in eliminating six targets inside a command post. Although both rifles completed the test in 30s, the Type 68 used only 13 shots while the M4 used all 30 shots. The edge was given to the Type 68 for its greater stopping power.
For long-range weapons, the SR-25 was tested against the PSL in eliminating six targets (3 static, 1 moving, 1 hidden, and 1 counter-sniper) during a simulated assault on a communications post. The SR-25 completed the test in 1m and 48s while the PSL completed the test in 2m and 7s. The edge was given to the SR-25 for its lighter recoil and 20-round magazine capacity.
For explosive weapons, the Box Mine was tested against the M18 Claymore in eliminating a group of three targets. The box mine failed to trigger the pointman's 100G shock patch but still killed it with a potentially fatal leg amputation while the M18 Claymore killed all three targets through its shrapnel spray. The edge was given to the M18 Claymore for its higher lethality.
For close combat, the NKSOF's hapkido+taekwondo combination was compared to the Army Ranger's SOCP. The combination of hapkido and taekwondo relies on using the attacker's energy against him and attacking his pressure points as well as using circular motions and quick strikes followed by a lethal finishing blow while SOCP relies on simple, quick blunt force to do damage and make space. Both styles of fighting were deemed to be equally effective but were factored into the simulation as X-factors, not weapons.
This is the only match-up without short range weapons, the third without any melee weapons, and the third to feature hand-to-hand combat (although this was the first time it was factored into the simulation).
This episode used footage from the film Black Hawk Down, which is based on the real-life story of Rangers risking their lives to recover fallen comrades.
This is the second battle where a combatant eliminates himself and an opponent in a suicide (the third Ranger, mortally wounded by the fourth NKSOF soldier, detonates a Claymore which kills both of them).
The PSL is one of two weapons to not score any kills in the Season 3-formatted simulation.
This battle is the closest match in Deadliest Warrior history with a difference of 4 kills.
A bonus scene not shown in the original broadcast available at Spike.com showed the battlefield tactics of each warrior in the scenario of North Korea invading South Korea and the response by the U.S., which Mack deemed too close to call for him to give either side the edge.
The U.S. Army Rangers are the second warrior to get the edge in explosive weapons and win (The other is the I.R.A.).

Reenactment 25

Somewhere along the Korean Peninsula, a group of 5 U.S. Army Rangers are getting set to raid a Korean occupied facility. The lead Ranger gestures with his arm, and the other Rangers copy as they march up to the facility. The Ranger sniper separates himself from the group and sets up his SR-25 rifle, surveying the area. He soon finds the enemy sniper and his spotter on a ledge, and a patrolling soldier further down. The Ranger takes aim and takes out the sniper.  He quickly changes targets to the half-aware patrolling soldier and quickly downs him. The sniper quickly vacates the area, hauling away the sniper rifle while the spotter crawls to avoid any further engagement and takes his AKM assault rifle. Meanwhile, the Ranger group marches slowly up a drainage ditch when one ranger trips a box landmine, sending him flying. Hearing the commotion, two Korean Special Ops emerge from a doorway and start firing full-auto volleys at the Rangers. The injured Ranger calls for help while another Ranger braves the shots and attempts to pull the downed man to safety. Soon, the Korean from the roof fires his AKM, cutting down the Ranger.  The downed Ranger is also shot through with the North Korean's Type 68.  Both sides continue to fire on each other until all three Koreans fall back into the facility. Seeing their chance, the Rangers begin their advance after the Koreans. Back inside, the Korean leader gestures to his friend to ambush them from the stairs while he goes on ahead. Two Rangers follow them into the building and are met with assault rifle fire. The Rangers waste no time and quickly kill the attacker, sending him over the railing. Meanwhile, the Ranger sniper comes to another part of the facility and whips off his backpack. A nearby NKSOF hears the commotion and goes to investigate. The sniper finishes rigging up a Claymore landmine, but is stopped dead in his tracks by the SOF's rifle fire. The intruding soldier walks up to confirm his kill, but the sniper, barely showing signs of life, presses the detonator. He is killed by the mine's explosion while the Korean is flung into the air and killed by the deadly shrapnel. Back inside the facility, both of the remaining Rangers are searching for the Korean leader. While cleverly hidden in the shadows, the Korean leader kills one of the Rangers when he comes too close. The Korean leader fires off one last round at the Ranger leader before emptying his gun. The Korean leader runs for the stairs as the Ranger leader spots him and takes a shot at him. The Korean leader sets his rifle down under cover from the stairs and continues his escape, while the cautious Ranger leader makes his way after him. The Korean leader sets himself hidden behind a wall and waits for the Ranger leader. The Ranger leader soon gets within range of the Korean leader as he tries to wrest his M4 away from him. The Ranger leader fights back and hits him across the face with the rifle. The Korean leader attacks with a spinning hook kick which spins the Ranger leader around and to his knees. The Korean leader tries to choke him from behind, but the Ranger leader flips him over his shoulder. Before he can do anything, the Korean leader kicks him in the head, knocking him down. The Korean leader gets to his feet as the Ranger leader does the same and tries to kick the M4 away from his hands. The Korean leader manages to hold down the rifle, but the Ranger leader counters with a headbutt. The Ranger leader stomps at the Korean leader to keep his distance and fires a rifle round into him, and the Korean leader drops dead. The Ranger raises his fist and shouts "Rangers lead the way!" in victory.

Winner: U.S. Army Rangers

Episode 26: Genghis Khan vs. Hannibal

Genghis Khan Team: Khosbayar (U.S. Marine & Mongol Weapons Expert), Timothy May, PhD (Author, "The Mongol Art of War")
Genghis Khan Weapons: Turko-Mongol Saber, Jida Lance, Mongol Recurve Bow
Genghis Khan Armor: Lamellar Armor
Genghis Khan Tactics: Feigned Retreat
Genghis Khan Statistics: 1206 A.D., Age: 39, Height: 5 Feet 8 Inches, Weight: 170 Pounds

Hannibal Team: Bryan Forrest (Classical Weapons Specialist), Patrick Hunt, PhD (Professor of Archaeology, Stanford)
Hannibal Weapons: Falcata, Soliferrum, War Elephant
Hannibal Armor: Musculata Armor
Hannibal Tactics: Double Envelopment
Hannibal Statistics: 216 B.C., Age: 26, Height: 5 Feet 7 Inches, Weight: 155 Pounds

This is the first time in which an animal (in this case, an elephant) was tested as a weapon.
For short-range weapons, the Turko-Mongol Saber was tested against the Falcata in eliminating four targets on foot and one target on horseback. In the first test, both swords achieved four kills but in the second test on horseback, the Saber succeeded while the Falcata failed. The Saber had a swing force of 72 mph but was deemed to be slower and draining on the users stamina while the Falcata was faster but had a swing force of only 66 mph. The edge was given to Genghis Khan's Turko-Mongol Saber for its cutting power and longer blade.
For mid-range weapons, the Jida Lance was tested against the Soliferrum in eliminating a moving target from horseback. Although the Jida was longer and more likely to achieve a kill, the edge was given to the Soliferrum since it could be used as a missile-weapon and that Hannibal would be carrying several of them.
For special weapons, the War Elephant was tested against the Recurve Bow. Suzie, not being a trained War Elephant, was egged on by her trainer, Hayden Rosenaur, throughout the testing. Mac did point out that these arrows would cause pain to the Elephant and likely cause it to panic and go out of control. The edge was given to the War Elephant for its massive intimidation and killing power.
For Armor, Hannibal's Bronze Musculata was tested against Genghis Khan's Steel Lamellar in protecting against the opposing warrior's sword. Both Hannibal and Genghis Khan's shields held well, with the arm behind it not encountering enough force to break bone. Both the Musculata and the Lamellar sustained harmless penetration, not enough to even touch the wearer. The edge was given to Genghis Khan due to the failure of Hannibal's helmet and since Genghis Khan's armor was made of a stronger material.
For military tactics, Hannibal's "Double Envelopment" was compared to Genghis Khan's "Feigned Retreat". At the Battle of Cannae, Hannibal tempted the Roman army into specifically attacking the center of his army by deploying in a formation that had strong flanks and a thin, weak center that was curved outward. The Roman infantry force of 70,000 took the bait by focusing all of their efforts onto the center until they were trapped in a double-envelopment and slaughtered down to only a handful of survivors. At the Battle of Kalka River, the Mongols, using only a small force of 2,000 Mongolian cavalry, agitated a sizable force of 30,000 Rus and Kipchaks into attacking them and kept them focused on trying to pursue them by constantly launching hit-and-run attacks and denying them the opportunity for a battle. The pursuit lasted for 9 days and stretched for 200 miles which left the Rus and Kipchaks disorganized, tired, and blindly determined which led to them being trapped and defeated by a waiting army of 18,000 Mongolians in an ambush on the banks of the Kalka River. The edge was given to Genghis Khan for his tactical ability in luring away and weakening the enemy. However while Khan was given the edge, in reality he was not present at the Battle of the Kalka River.
This is the only reality based episode in season 3 that did not feature any black-powder weapons.
This is the second episode not to feature a long-range category (although the Soliferrum and the Recurve Bow are projectile weapons in the mid and special weapons categories).
Percentage wise, Hannibal's Soliferrum is the most dominating weapon in any category of season 3.
Genghis Khan is the only warrior of season 3 to win after getting the battle field tactics edge.
The War Elephant is the sixteenth weapon to be given the edge yet score fewer kills than the opposing weapon.
This was the only episode in the entire series where a weapon (the War Elephant) used by the combatants is itself a living creature.
Genghis Khan and two of his Mongolians all fire arrows at the Hannibal's men; if the arrow that killed a Carthaginian soldier was Genghis' arrow, he would be tied with Crazy Horse, Hernan Cortes, the Spetsnaz leader, and arguably Saddam Hussein for 4 human kills in the simulation.

Reenactment 26

The battle starts with Genghis Khan, who is mounted on horseback, and 4 of his Mongol soldiers out walking on a hillside. They soon hear a strange noise and see Hannibal, who is mounted up on a war elephant and being accompanied by 4 Carthaginians: 3 foot soldiers and a single horseman. Hannibal soon makes visual contact with Genghis, and Genghis orders his men to load their bow and arrows. They aim upwards and fire, one which comes down in Hannibal's shield, and another which sticks in an unlucky Carthaginian. In retaliation, Hannibal orders his horseman to ride on and attack with Soliferrums. As he charges, one Mongol breaks from the group and charges into battle with his Jida Lance, only to be struck down by one of the Soliferrums. Khan rides off and soon returns the favor to the Carthaginian with his own Jida Lance, which one of his men hands to him. Back on the other side of the hill, Hannibal dismounts from his elephant and prods him on with a Soliferrum to charge at the Mongolians. The three Mongolians kneel down and shoot at the elephant with their recurve bow and arrows, but soon retreat as the elephant charges in, trampling one Mongolian. The Mongolians regroup and continue assaulting the elephant with arrows, firing arrows into its hide and head, and driving it away from the battlefield. Elsewhere, Khan rides in on his war horse and strikes down a Carthaginian soldier with his Turko-Mongol Saber. Meanwhile, one of the Carthaginians charges at the two remaining Mongolians, catching one's attention by throwing a Soliferrum at his head. The iron javelin is deflected by the Mongolian's shield and both men turn to face the Carthaginian. One tries to hack at him with a Mongol saber, but he deflects the blow and stabs him through his leather lamellar with his Falcata. He then tries to strike at the last Mongol's legs, but the Mongol jumps back and slashes his leg. While he is kneeling, the Mongol quickly follows up with a slash to the face, killing the Carthaginian. His victory is short-lived, however, as Hannibal comes up from behind and impales him through the chest with his Falcata. Genghis Khan soon spots Hannibal again and rides up toward him, throwing away his Mongol bow and dismounting. He walks up to him, measuring him up, and then gives a war cry while drawing his saber. Both men clash swords, which are caught by both shields. Hannibal goes for a vertical head shot with his Falcata, but Genghis shakes off the blow and slashes Hannibal across the thigh. Hannibal goes for a horizontal slash, but Genghis ducks under the sword and hits Hannibal's shield out of his hands. Tired and desperate, Hannibal deflects blows from the saber and goes for a thrust strike with the falcata, but it fails to pass through the steel lamellar armor. Enraged, Genghis counters with two consecutive head shots to Hannibal's brass helmet, severely denting it and knocking Hannibal dizzy. Genghis Khan then spins around and delivers the final strike, slashing Hannibal across the neck and cutting neck arteries. Hannibal falls down dead as The Great Khan gives a victorious shout.

Winner: Genghis Khan

Episode 27: Saddam Hussein vs. Pol Pot

Saddam Hussein Team: Sabah Khodada (Former Iraqi Army General), Calvin Bondley (Saddam Weapons Specialist), Lt. Col. Rick Francona [ret] (Former U.S.A.F. & C.I.A. Agent)
Saddam Hussein Weapons: Combat Knife, Browning Semi-Automatic Pistol, RPK Light Machine Gun, RGD-5 Grenade
Saddam Hussein Statistics: Age: 50, Height: 6 Feet 2 Inches, Weight: 215 Pounds, Reign of Terror: 1979–2003

Pol Pot Team: Jonathan Khan (Pol Pot Weapons Expert), Kilong Ung (Cambodian Genocide Survivor)
Pol Pot Weapons: Cane Knife, Tokarev TT-33, RPD Light Machine Gun, Chinese Stick Grenade
Pol Pot Statistics: Age: 50, Height: 5 Feet 9 Inches, Weight: 194 Pounds, Reign of Terror: 1975–1979

This is the first episode to use multiple weapons in a single test.
For short-range weapons, the combat knife was tested against the cane knife in eliminating two targets. The combat knife killed both targets with a stabbing speed of 40 mph while the cane knife had a slashing speed of 45 mph but failed to kill the second target. The edge was given to the combat knife for its flexibility and portability.
For mid-range weapons, the Browning Hi-Power was tested against the TT-33 in eliminating two targets at phase 3 of the first test. Although the TT-33 finished the test at 2:02, the edge was given to the Browning Hi-Power for its 13-round capacity and heavier caliber.
For long-range weapons, the RPK was tested against the RPD in eliminating a missed target in phase 1 of the first test, five targets in phase 2 of the same test, and eliminating two targets in a motorcade ambush with 80 rounds. During the first test, the RPK completed Phase 1 at 0:09 and Phase 2 at 1:20, but had to be reloaded, while the RPD completed Phase 1 at 0:12 and Phase 2 at 1:49. During the Motorcade Ambush test, the RPK completed with 59s while the RPD completed with 46s. The edge was given to the RPD for its 100-round Drum Magazine.
For explosive weapons, the RGD-5 grenade was tested against the Chinese Stick Grenade in eliminating four targets at phase 1 of the first test. Although both Grenades only killed three targets, the edge was given to the Chinese Stick Grenade for its higher explosive payload and lower risk of rolling off-target.
Sabah Khodada, who served under Saddam Hussein until he was imprisoned for insubordination, is the first expert of the series unable to speak English, necessitating fellow expert Rick Francona to translate for him. He is also the only expert to have personally known one of the named warriors. The show erroneously says he was a general, but he was actually a captain in the Republican Guard.
This is the only episode in season 3 where both warriors use more than 3 weapons.
This is the second episode in which a warrior was able to take out two opponents in the simulation at once with an explosion, the first being Navy Seal vs Israeli Commando.
The RPD Light Machine Gun is one of two weapons to not score any kills in the Season 3-formatted simulation.
Despite the results being close, this is the most lopsided match-up of season 3.
Saddam Hussein is the thirteenth warrior of thirteen to win after scoring more kills at mid range and long range.
The RPD Light Machine Gun is the seventeenth weapon to get the edge and score fewer kills than the opposing weapon.
Saddam Hussein is tied with either Joan of Arc for 3 kills or arguably the Spetsnaz leader, Hernan Cortes, and Crazy Horse for 4 kills, since Saddam and his closest soldier killed a Khmer rouge soldier together from the balcony, in the final simulation.
A bonus clip showcases each dictator's preferred method of torture: Pol Pot's electric shock and Saddam Hussein's chemical bath.
Ironically, Pol Pot's reign of terror ended in 1979, while Saddam Hussein's started in the same year.
This is the only episode where a team member actually knew the individual he was representing. Sabah Khodada knew Hussein, and was even gifted an inscribed Browning Hi-Power by the dictator himself.

Reenactment 27

Inside a war-torn Iraqi city, Saddam Hussein sits in his office looking over paperwork while 3 of his Republican Guard soldiers stand watch outside his building and 1 is inside protecting him. Outside, 4 armed Khmer Rouge guerrillas run in, hiding behind building and pillar cover. One Khmer Rouge takes out his stick grenade and lobs it at the checkpoint's guardhouse. The grenade explodes, killing two soldiers. Both Hussein and his bodyguard are alerted to the explosion as they both exit the office to see the commotion. Back outside, a firefight starts between the only Republican Guard soldier unscathed by the grenade and the Khmer Rouge rebels. The Iraqi soldier takes his RGD-5 grenade and lobs it to the pillars, killing one Cambodian insurgent and stunning another to his knees. Both Hussein and his bodyguard burst from a second-story balcony and join the fray, shooting and killing the guerrilla before he can get back to his feet. The bodyguard stops for a minute to reload a fresh magazine into his RPK machine gun as Pol Pot enters the scene and takes the dead rebel's RPD machine gun and fires at the balcony. Under heavy fire and outgunned, Saddam calls for a retreat as he, his bodyguard, and the last checkpoint guard fall back inside the building. Pol Pot and his remaining soldiers cross the street and are about to raid the building when Saddam's motorcade comes veering around the corner, with a worried Saddam telling the driver to hurry. Pol Pot and two of his men quickly head him off and fire on the automobile, with Pol Pot's Tokarev shooting the driver in the face and killing him, making Saddam very angry. The Khmer Rouge forces dive out of the way as the motorcade speeds ahead uncontrollably and crashes into the side of a house. Saddam and his bodyguard quickly exit the vehicle as one Khmer Rouge rebel fires at the car with his RPD, shooting the gas tank and causing the motorcade to explode. The Khmer Rouge guerrilla moves in with his gun raised, inspecting the flaming wreckage to see the driver dead. The last Republican Guard pops out of the doorway of the building he entered and fires at the rebel, forcing him to regroup behind cover with Pol Pot and the other rebel, who return fire. The RPD guerrilla stands up to fire at the guard, but is shot down by Saddam who emerges from the second-story window, firing his Browning pistol. Saddam's bodyguard finishes the last of his RPK ammo and quickly draws his Browning while withdrawing into the safety of the building. Pol Pot and his remaining soldier then move on to the building, Tokarevs at the ready with Pol Pot quickly pointing his upward and shooting. In the alley behind the building, the bodyguard waits for the Khmer Rouge forces to show themselves. The Khmer Rouge rebel soon enters the alley and engages the bodyguard, but Pol Pot quickly puts him down from behind with a strike from his cane knife. Pot then motions for the rebel to move into the house while Pot frees his knife from the dead guard's back. The rebel moves into the house, but sees nothing. He motions for Pol Pot to come in, but is soon attacked by Saddam, who stabs his combat knife through the front of his chest. Pol Pot empties the rest of his Tokarev ammo as Saddam drags the dead rebel inside. He drops his Tokarev on the ground and cautiously enters the building. Through a window, he sees Saddam standing behind a wall with only his left arm visible. Pol Pot makes his move and rounds the corner, swinging his cane knife into the dictator's neck. However, he realizes too late he has cut into his dead comrade, wearing Saddam's jacket. The real Hussein comes to his side, wearing an undershirt, raises his Browning to Pol Pot's head, saying "This is a weapon" in Arabic, and pulls the trigger. After Pol Pot drops out of view, Saddam raises his gun in the air and shouts "Allāhu Akbar!" (God is great) in victory.

Winner: Saddam Hussein

Episode 28: Theodore Roosevelt vs. Lawrence of Arabia

Theodore Roosevelt Team: Gsgt. Quay Terry [ret] (United States Marine Corps), Gary Harper (Military Historian/Armorer)
Theodore Roosevelt Weapons: Bowie Hunter, 1896 Krag Carbine, Gatling Gun
Theodore Roosevelt Tactics: "Suppress & Slaughter"
Theodore Roosevelt Statistics: Circa: 1898, Age: 39, Height: 5 Feet 8 Inches, Weight: 210 Pounds

Lawrence of Arabia Team: Richard Reid (British Firearms Specialist), Gavin Scott (T. E. Lawrence Historian)
Lawrence of Arabia Weapons: Jambiya Dagger, Short Magazine Lee Enfield Rifle, Vickers Machine Gun
Lawrence of Arabia Tactics: "Phantom Army"
Lawrence of Arabia Statistics: Circa: 1916, Age: 29, Height: 5 Feet 5 Inches, Weight: 130 Pounds

This is the first episode to test rapid fire crew-served weapons.
For short-range weapons, the bowie hunter was tested against the jambiya in eliminating two targets. The bowie hunter only killed one target and had an impact force of 42 mph while the jambiya killed both targets and had an impact force of 51 mph. The edge was given to the jambiya for its larger blade.
For mid-range weapons, the SMLE was tested against the Springfield 1896 Krag in velocity, damage, recoil performance, and in eliminating 8 targets (3 static, 3 moving, and 2 pop-up) with 20 rounds during a simulated assault. During the assault test, the Springfield Krag scored an 8/8 kill ratio and a 16/20 hit ratio of 80% in 2:26 while the SMLE scored a 7/8 kill ratio and a 14/20 hit ratio of 70% in 2:15. Although the Springfield Krag was lighter and more accurate and the SMLE was stronger, faster to reload, and could hold twice as many rounds; ultimately, the weapons were considered to be equally matched in their overall effectiveness.
For long-range weapons, the Gatling gun was tested against the Vickers machine gun in eliminating 18 targets with 250 rounds. The Gatling gun scored a 13/18 kill ratio in 1:11 while the Vickers scored a 14/18 kill ratio in 1:41 but jammed once. The edge was given to the Gatling gun for its faster rate of fire and resistance to jamming.
For military tactics, Roosevelt's Charge, aka "Suppress and Slaughter" was compared to Lawrence's  Hit Hard and Vanish, aka "Phantom Army". At the battle of San Juan Hill, the Rough Riders came under artillery and infantry fire and Roosevelt responded by ordering his Gatling gun detachment to provide suppressing fire which allowed his troops to charge up and take the San Juan and Kettle hill positions. At the Battle of Aqaba, Lawrence used several raids on the train routes north of the position to trick the Turkish army into thinking he was going to attack Damascus. The Turks took the bait by launching a pursuit against the Bedouin raiders which left only a battalion to defend Aqaba and allowed Lawrence to take the strategic port city after a successful attack. The edge was given to Lawrence for his tactical ability in deceiving and outmaneuvering the enemy.
Lawrence of Arabia is the first warrior whose team members are not of the same nationality (Lawrence was a Lieutenant Colonel in the British Army who fought with Hashemite Arabs).
This is the only episode in season 3 to reveal the amount of kills for a weapon (10,316 kills for the Gatling gun and 7,544 kills for the Vickers machine gun).
A bonus scene featuring the Battlefield Experience X-Factor which was only mentioned in the original broadcast is available at Spike.com.
This is the third episode in which the two opponents would have been allies in a real life combat situation. Theodore Roosevelt was very staunch and very vocal in his support of the Anglo-French Allies in World War I, even going so far as to offer to raise and lead up to four divisions of rough rider-style volunteers to fight against the Germans in France after the U.S. entered the war in 1917 – an offer which Pres. Wilson turned down flat. Roosevelt never forgave Wilson for doing so. Also, while President some years earlier, Roosevelt made it quite clear that the U.S. would cover the British Empire's back in any quarrel with Germany.

Reenactment 28
The battle begins on a hillside, where Roosevelt and 4 of his Rough Riders are congregating with each other. Roosevelt looks up the hill to suddenly see Lawrence in full desert garb coming over the hill. Roosevelt distances himself slightly to measure up the stranger when Lawrence suddenly motions with his hand, summoning his Bedouin tribesmen carrying weapons and machine gun parts. Roosevelt calls for his men to prepare the Gatling gun as Lawrence and his men prepare the Vickers machine gun and fire their SMLE rifles. Roosevelt takes aim and fires with his Krag rifle as the Rough Riders cart out their Gatling gun and aim it up the hill. The Vickers gunner opens fire on the Rough Riders, killing one of the gunners as he tries to run behind the Gatling for cover. The Gatling crew begins to crank out fire as Roosevelt and the other Rough Riders fire their Krag rifles. Eventually, one of Lawrence's men is taken by the gunfire as the Vickers gun suddenly jams. Outgunned by the Gatling, Lawrence orders his men to retreat back down the hill. Seeing their opponents flee back down the hill, Roosevelt orders the Gatling gunner to cease fire as the two riflemen run up the hill, inspecting the machine gun site. One of the riflemen waves his hand, signaling "All Clear". Meanwhile, Lawrence of Arabia and his men make their way up the other side of Colonel Roosevelt's position, unbeknownst to him and the gunner. Lawrence takes out a bundle of dynamite and lights the fuse. The blast rocks the hillside as Roosevelt and the gunner quickly turn the Gatling towards the area of the blast. While their backs are turned, a Bedouin rebel shoots out the gunner. Roosevelt turns around and aims his Krag as the other two riflemen regroup with him, taking aim at the Bedouin. Behind them, another Bedouin charges over the hill, but is shot down as one of the riflemen mounts the Gatling, shooting him before he even comes within range. The other Bedouin aims his SMLE and fires, hitting Roosevelt in the left arm and forcing him to kneel. One of the Rough Riders takes aim and kills the Bedouin while he is still exposed. The other Rough Rider helps Roosevelt to his feet, with Roosevelt assuring him that he's okay. Before they come to their senses, Lawrence fires his SMLE, shooting a Rough Rider in the back of the head. Roosevelt then regains his senses and shoots the Bedouin across the hill. Both men now give chase after Lawrence of Arabia, attempting to reload their rifles. Lawrence jumps down into a trench as the pursuing rifleman reloads his Krag. The rifleman slowly makes his way down the trench, aiming his rifle in front of him when Lawrence comes around the corner, jambiya knife in hand. The rifleman tries to hit Lawrence with the stock of the rifle, but Lawrence ducks and counters with a slash to the Rider's shoulder, knocking off his hat. Angered, the Rough Rider attempts to draw his knife, but Lawrence follows up with two slashes to the chest, killing him. Behind him, Roosevelt inhales deeply and draws his Bowie Hunter knife, preparing to show down with Lawrence. Lawrence takes a step forward and swings, causing Roosevelt to shout and lunge forward. Lawrence jumps back and counters with two slashes. Roosevelt jumps back and feints a slash, following up with a punch to Lawrence's face. While he is still stunned, Roosevelt grabs Lawrence's Keffiyeh and wraps it around Lawrence's hand and stabbed him in the gut. Lawrence then fell over. Roosevelt raised his bloodied Bowie Hunter and yelled in victory.

Winner: Theodore Roosevelt

Episode 29: Ivan the Terrible vs. Hernán Cortés

Ivan the Terrible Team: Vladimir Orlov (Russian Special Forces Trainer), Andrew Jenks, PhD (Professor of Russian Studies)
Ivan the Terrible Weapons: Sablia, Bardiche, Pischal
Ivan the Terrible Armor: Plated Mail, Fluted Helmet
Ivan the Terrible Statistics: Circa 1560 A.D., Age: 30, Height: 6 Feet, Weight: 180 Pounds

Hernán Cortés Team: Jason Heck (16th Century Weapons Expert), Kyle Lopez (Spanish Colonial Expert)
Hernán Cortés Weapons: Espada Ropera, Alabarda, Arquebus
Hernán Cortés Armor: Steel Breastplate, Tassets, Morion Helmet
Hernán Cortés Statistics: Circa 1521 A.D., Age: 36, Height: 5 Feet 4 Inches, Weight: 135 Pounds

This is the first episode to feature matchlock rifles, disproving the myth of their inaccuracy.
For short-range weapons, the sablia was tested against the espada ropera in slashing, thrusting, and horseback performance. The sablia passed both tests while the espada ropera cut a pig in half but failed on horseback. The edge was given for the sablia for its performance on horseback.
For mid-range weapons, the bardiche was tested against the alabarda in eliminating a gel torso and an opponent on horseback. The bardiche completely destroyed the gel torso but failed to take out the rider while the alabarda eliminated both the gel torso and the rider. The edge was given the alabarda for its lighter weight, flexibility, and reach.
For long-range weapons, the arquebus was tested against the pischal in eliminating 3 targets and piercing the opposing warrior's armor. Although both weapons killed all three targets with only two shots and pierced the opposing warrior's armor, the edge was given to the pischal for its faster reload, better accuracy and its stabilizing mount (the arquebus used a stave to stabilize the gun's barrel as the pischal used the bardiche; one of Mack's notes on this was that you had a weapon already prepared for use once the opponent was within a range that made the gun useless.)
For armor, Cortés' steel cuirass was compared to Ivan's plated mail in protection capability. Although both suits could be pierced by the opponent's long-range weapon, the edge was given to Cortés' steel cuirass for better resistance against thrusting and slashing blows.
This is the second episode to have a neutral nonparticipant both be in and die in the simulation, the first simulation to use slow motion, and the first time a warrior forcibly sacrifices one of his men (Ivan the Terrible uses him as a human shield).
Hernán Cortés is tied with the Spetsnaz leader, Crazy Horse, and arguably Saddam Hussein for most humans killed in the final battle with 4 kills.
A bonus clip showcases each conqueror's preferred method of torture: Ivan's quartering and Cortés' garrotte.

Reenactment 29

The battle begins in a field with Ivan the Terrible knelt in a silent prayer, surrounded by 2 Oprichniki horsemen and 2 streltsy. He looks toward the sky, and then looks down to a bloodied Spanish prisoner tied to two horses, who is about to be pulled apart. Ivan smirks at the condemned as he rises from his kneeling position. Elsewhere, Hernán Cortés and 4 of his Conquistadors are out for a ride when Cortés suddenly spots the group of Russian men. Ivan nods to one of the hooded Oprichniki and the horsemen begin to pull. Ivan laughs at the prisoner's pain as Cortés, who has dismounted from horseback, shows concern and signals for his men to take position with their Arquebuses. Ivan immediately stops laughing when he notices the group of men aiming their firearms at his death squad. Cortés gives the signal with his sword and the conquistadors open fire. Before the gunmen fire, Ivan quickly grabs one of his soldiers and pulls him in front of him. The soldier is killed by the assault of bullets but the Tsar is only knocked to the ground.  As the Spanish Soldiers hurry to reload their Arquebuses, Ivan gets back to his feet and runs over to one of the horses, pulling the Oprichnik down. Meanwhile, the last Russian soldier sets up his Bardiche as a mount for his Pischal, shooting and killing one of the Spaniards who shot the other soldier.  Ivan draws his Sablia and rides on, pulling the prisoner in half and dragging the torso behind him. The remaining soldier and the dismounted Oprichnik charge the Spaniards. The conquistadors calmly hold their ground as one of the Spaniards takes an Alabarda from his horse and hands it to Cortés. As the Conquistadors continue to reload, Ivan rides up and slashes one of them in the face, killing him instantly.  He then changes course and rides to a retreating conquistador who has his Espada Ropera drawn and slashes him in the back of the neck, also killing him. Elsewhere, the mounted Oprichnik draws his Sablia and rides towards Cortés, who is still armed with his Alabarda. Cortés holds his ground and reaches with the poleaxe, pulling the hooded man down from horseback. Cortés then raises the pike end and brings it down into the Oprichnik's face.  The last Oprichnik charges at Cortés with his saber drawn. Cortés lifts the halberd from the dead man's hood, parrying the sword and countering with a thrust attack, which impales the Oprichnik through the chest.  Cortés then calls for his horse, which the last mounted conquistador brings to him. The last conquistador then rides on with his sword drawn. However, he is shot off his horse by the last Russian soldier, who then finishes him off with a strike to the midsection with his Bardiche while he is still down. Cortés then charges forth on his horse, slashing the soldier in the face with his Espada Ropera as he lifts the heavy Bardiche for a strike.  Ivan then spots Cortés and charges at him, sword raised. Ivan slashes Cortés as he rides by, but Cortés is unfazed as the saber bounces off his steel breastplate. After the charge is finished, Ivan notices that Cortés managed to cut him on his right cheek. Ivan gleefully licks the blood from his finger, then gives a shout as he and Cortés charge each other, both men shouting. As the warriors ride past each other, Cortés ducks under Ivan's wild swing and thrusts his sword forward, puncturing Ivan's neck. Ivan slumps down in his saddle as he quickly bleeds out, then falls face down from his horse to the ground.  Hernán Cortés then walks up to the fallen Tsar, holding his right breast where the sword struck him and kicks Ivan to make sure that he's dead. Seeing no movement, Cortés holds his sword up and kneels down, taking Ivan's money pouch and finding gold coins, smiling at the spoils. Then the Spanish conquistador  stands up and raises his sword, shouting "¡Gloria!" (Glory) triumphantly.

Winner: Hernán Cortés

Episode 30: Crazy Horse vs. Pancho Villa

Crazy Horse Team: Moses Brings Plenty (Lakota Tribesman/Firearms Expert), Delano "Blu" Eagle (Fmr U.S. Marine/Lakota Tribesman)
Crazy Horse Weapons: Inyankapemni Club, 1873 Colt, 1860 Henry Repeating Rifle
Crazy Horse Tactics: Hit and Run
Crazy Horse Statistics: Circa 1876, Age: 36, Height: 5 Feet 8 Inches, Weight: 140 Pounds

Pancho Villa Team: Fernando Vazquez (Expert Marksman/Horseman), Santiago Villalobos (Villa Folklore Historian)
Pancho Villa Weapons: Bolo Knife, Colt Bisley, 1894 Winchester Repeating Rifle
Pancho Villa Tactics: El Golpe Terrifico (The Terrific Blow)
Pancho Villa Statistics: Circa 1914, Age: 36, Height: 5 Feet 10 Inches, Weight: 170 Pounds

For short-range weapons, the Inyankapemni club was tested against the bolo knife in damaging a gel torso in 15 secs. The Inyankapemni caused a depressed skull fracture and had a swing force of 104 mph but broke during the test while the bolo knife achieved a decapitation. The edge was given to the bolo knife for its durability and flexibility.
For mid-range weapons, the Colt Bisley was tested against the 1873 Colt in ballistics performance and eliminating five targets with six rounds without hitting a horse. The Colt Bisley had a muzzle velocity of 1168 fps while the Colt 1873 had a muzzle velocity of 997 fps but caused more internal damage. In the second test, both guns had a 5/6 hit ratio with the 1873 Colt scoring a 3/5 kill ratio in 21s to the Colt Bisley's 2/5 kill ratio in 17s. The edge was given to the 1873 Colt for its longer barrel and higher damage.
For long-range weapons, the 1860 Henry was tested against the 1894 Winchester in eliminating four targets at 50 yards and five targets on horseback. In the first test, the 1860 Henry scored a 40% hit ratio and 2 kills in 1:15 but jammed once while the 1894 Winchester scored a 40% hit ratio and 1 kill in 48s. In the second test, both weapons scored a 3/5 hit ratio with 2 kills to the 1860 Henry and 1 kill to the 1894 Winchester. The edge was given to the 1894 Winchester since it was a newer and more reliable rifle.
For military tactics, Pancho Villa's "Ferocious Blow" was compared to Crazy Horse's "Hit and Run". At the Second Battle of Torreón, Pancho began his attack with an infantry advance which was a failure that resulted in them being counter-attacked and bombarded by a numerically superior force of 10,000 federale soldiers. Pancho's villistas soon redoubled their efforts by moving in at night and besieging the position that the artillery fire came from. At the Battle of Rosebud Creek, General Crook attempted to array his cavalry in a single line on the high ground which Crazy Horse anticipated and responded to with hit and run raids. Due to a communications breakdown and inability to hit the attacking Sioux/Cheyenne raiders, Crazy Horse launched a frontal attack while Crook's forces were reloading and managed to outflank and overrun them, forcing General Crook to withdraw and resulting in the annihilation of Custer's 7th Cavalry at the Little Bighorn. The edge was given to Crazy Horse for his tactical abilities in using the terrain to his advantage, outmaneuvering the enemy, and using their numbers and inability to coordinate and resupply against them.
This is the first episode of season 3 to show a weapon that did not go into the simulation (Crazy Horse's self bow.)  Although, while Crazy Horse had the bow in the simulation, he never used it.
Crazy Horse is tied with the Spetznaz leader (vs Green Berets), Hernán Cortés, and arguably Saddam Hussein for most human kills in a simulation (four), and is the only warrior to lose the match while doing this.

Reenactment 30

The battle starts under a tree at Pancho Villa's campsite, where 4 Villistas are inspecting their weapons and Pancho slicing and eating a pomegranate with his bolo knife. Not far away, Crazy Horse and 4 Lakota come over the hill, himself and two other Lakota mounted on horseback. Villa and his Villistas look over to the hill just as Crazy Horse and his men give loud war whoops. Sensing a fight, Pancho orders his men to arm up as he sheaths his bolo. As the Lakotas charge forth firing their repeating Henry rifles, the Villistas take defensive positions and return fire with their repeating Winchester rifles. As one Villistas rides into the middle of the field, another takes aim with his Colt Bisley and fires, killing one of the other mounted Lakota who slumps down in his saddle. As the Villista rides towards the Lakota, he is fatally shot by Crazy Horse using his Henry rifle, and falls down from his horse. The Villa Revolutionaries continue to fire until the Lakota come too close for comfort. The Mexicans retreat from their campsite for better cover, with Villa mounting a horse and escaping. Crazy Horse regroups with his fellow men and give celebratory war whoops to each other. The remaining 4 Native Americans then decide to split up into two groups: Crazy Horse and the other mounted Lakota on horseback, and the other two Lakota on foot. An unknown amount of time passes as seen by clouds moving overhead. In a nearby field, Crazy Horse and his fellow brave have dismounted and are navigating the tall grass with rifles in hand. The other Lakota suddenly steps on a large twig, giving their position to the other 2 Villistas. Behind tree cover, one of the Villistas fires his Winchester and shoots the other Lakota in the head. Crazy Horse ducks down and disappears into the grass. The Villistas cautiously wait for Crazy Horse to make his move, with one of them shooting into the grass with his Bisley. The Lakota chief, moving and camouflaged, reappears and aims his Colt, shooting the Villista with the Winchester in the eye. The other Villista fires his Bisley at the Lakota chief as he makes a run for his life. Crazy Horse quickly holsters his revolver and gives chase. Meanwhile, in the forest, the natives follow Pancho and the last Villista, cornering them behind trees. Both revolutionaries pull out their Colt Bisleys and fire, shooting one of the natives as he rises from cover and draws his revolver. While Pancho has a shootout with the other native, the other revolutionary attempts to reload his gun, only to be shot in the neck by Crazy Horse who appears right behind the two Mexicans. Crazy Horse draws a bead on Pancho, but discovers he has depleted the last of his Colt ammo and readies his war club, preparing to get the drop on the Mexican general. Pancho stops firing at the last Lakota brave as he sees his last Villista run up behind him and run him through with his bolo knife. The Villista then runs past Villa, and noticing Crazy horse, charges at him. He is quickly put down by a blow to the head from Crazy Horse's war club. As the Lakota chief advances at the Mexican general, Pancho attempts to fire his revolver which has run out of ammo. Crazy Horse brings the club down on his left shoulder, causing him to shout in pain. Pancho Villa then drops his guns and draws his bolo knife. After each swings and misses, Pancho closes and cuts Crazy Horse across the chest. The Lakota brave goes down and Villa goes in for an overhead cut, which is blocked by Crazy Horse holding the club out in front of him. The club breaks, and Crazy Horse forces Pancho off with his leg. He distracts Pancho Villa by throwing the stone end of the club at Pancho's face and with Pancho stunned, Crazy Horse gets to his feet and tries to stab him with the splintered handle. Pancho grabs Crazy Horse by the hand and stops him, just before stabbing the chief in the chest. As Crazy Horse slumps down, Pancho removes his knife in a slashing motion and adds a cut to the neck of his opponent. Pancho then stands up and raises his arms, shouting triumphantly "¡Victoria!" (Victory!).

Winner: Pancho Villa

Episode 31: French Foreign Legion vs. Gurkhas

French Foreign Legion Team: Cpl. Nick Hughes [ret] (FFL Recon Diver/Commando), Geoff Wawro, PhD (French Foreign Legion Historian)
French Foreign Legion Weapons: Camillus, MAS-36 Rifle, Browning Automatic Rifle
French Foreign Legion Tactics: Active Defense
French Foreign Legion Statistics: Circa: 1940–45, Age: 27, Height: 5 Feet 8 Inches, Weight: 155 Pounds

Gurkha Team: Sgt. Rastra Rai [ret] (20-Year Gurkha Soldier), Lt. John Conlin [ret] (Former Gurkha Commander)
Gurkha Weapons: Kukri, Enfield No. 4 Rifle, Bren Light Machine Gun 
Gurkha Tactics: Improvised Ambush
Gurkha Statistics: Circa: 1940–45, Age: 19, Height: 5 Feet 3 Inches, Weight: 135 Pounds

For short-range weapons, the kukri was tested against the camillus in eliminating 3 targets (2 guards, 1 pop-up). Although both weapons scored 3 kills with the camillus having a higher strike force of 81 mph to the kukri's 59 mph, the edge was given to the kukri for its larger blade.
For mid-range weapons, the MAS-36 was tested against the Lee–Enfield No.4 in terminal ballistics and in eliminating 5 targets (3 moving, 2 static) with 20 rounds. In the first test, the MAS-36 had a muzzle velocity of 2647fps compared to 2417fps for the Lee–Enfield No.4. In the second test, both rifles had a 5/5 kill ratio with the Lee–Enfield No.4 scoring a 13/20 hit ratio in 2:07 and the MAS-36 scoring a 14/20 hit ratio in 2:54. The edge was given to the Lee–Enfield No.4 for its faster reload and longer range.
For long-range weapons, the BAR was tested against the Bren in eliminating 3 targets at 100, 50, and 25 yards. The BAR completed the test in 58s while the Bren completed the test in 53s but jammed once. The edge was given to the BAR for its mechanical reliability, lighter weight, smaller recoil, and longer range.
The rate of fatigue for the French Foreign Legion was 10.9%, and 5.02% for the Gurkhas.  This was factored in due to the legendary regimens of each warrior. The Legionaries brutally train in the desert, complete with severe corporal punishment and the world's highest training mortality rate. The Gurkhas are physiologically less susceptible to fatigue due to the high altitude mountainous environment in which they live, strengthening their legs from incessant high incline traversal and lessening their dependence on oxygen after generations of exposure to the thin mountain air.
Even though both fighting forces still exist today, this match puts them both in World War II due to their reputation during that period. That makes this the fourth match-up where the opponents are contemporaneous allies (they both fought for the Allies during World War II).
This is the first episode to feature warriors fighting under a country other than their native one (the Gurkhas fight for the United Kingdom and the Legion is open to foreigners who want to serve France). The French Foreign Legion is thus the second warrior group composed of different nationalities.
A bonus clip available on Spike.com showcases additional X-Factors that went into the simulator.

Reenactment 31

The battle begins with 5 relaxed French Foreign Legionnaires milling about at their campsite. Not far away, a squad of 5 Gurkhas are preparing an ambush. A legionnaire sentry relieves his fellow guardsman as the lead Gurkha cuts a hole in the legion's barbed wire fence using wire snips. The sentry watches along the perimeter of the camp site, unaware of the Gurkhas' position. A Gurkha takes aim with his Lee–Enfield No. 4 and fires, alerting the rest of the legion. The legion immediately scramble for defensive positions, firing their MAS-36 rifles and BAR machine guns while the Gurkhas fire back with their Lee–Enfields and Bren machine guns. As his position begins to crumble, the sentry attempts to leave his sandbag cover, but is shot down in the crossfire.  An African legionnaire quickly re-cocks his bolt action MAS and fires, killing a Gurkha.  He quickly fires off one more shot before running back for cover behind sandbags. As the rest of the small legion falls back, the Gurkhas start to advance, taking position in front of the sandbags and continuing to lay down covering fire as two Gurkhas run up through the camp, dodging small artillery fire and jumping over the barbed wire barricade. A Gurkha jumps out of cover and briefly stops to clear a jam in his Bren machine gun, but is shot by a legionnaire who gets up from his position and fires his BAR at the Gurkha.  As soon as he's visible, a Gurkha behind a nearby tree shoots him in the head with his Lee–Enfield rifle. While the other Gurkhas inspect the tents for any other legionnaires, the African legionnaire pops out of cover behind sandbags and shoots one of the wandering Gurkhas in the head.  The other Gurkha sniper quickly retaliates by shooting him in the head while he's still standing.  As the Gurkhas draw closer to the 2 remaining legionnaires, the lead legionnaire jumps out of cover and fires his MAS at the lead Gurkha. The Gurkha takes cover behind a tent as the 2 legionnaires unload the rest of their ammo at the retreating Gurkhas. As they retreat, the lead Gurkha gestures to his partner to split up as the 2 legionnaires come charging at them. Nearby, the other legionnaire cautiously searches for his prey, aiming his rifle. The lead Gurkha sneaks up behind him and brings his kukri blade down, cutting through the legionnaire's kepi and into his skull.  The other Gurkha, armed with his kukri, is also brought down from behind as the lead legionnaire grabs him from behind and stabs him in the neck with his Callimus knife. The two leaders soon confront each other near a hillside, knives in hand as a knife fight showdown ensues. Both leaders step to each other, daring the other to attack. As soon as they come closer to each other, they begin to swing at each other, with the Gurkha scoring the first strike with a backhanded cut across the left cheek. The Gurkha goes in for a follow-up strike, but the legionnaire counters with a strike across the right cheek that causes the Gurkha to stumble down the hillside. As soon as he regains his balance, the legionnaire goes in for a strike and follows up with a thrust. The Gurkha recovers and moves out of the way, causing the legionnaire's Callimus to get stuck in a log that was behind the Gurkha. As the legionnaire tries to free his knife, the Gurkha takes the opportunity to slash his opponent diagonally across the back and kick him. The legionnaire frees his knife and swings his knife 180 degrees, causing the Gurkha to jump back. The Gurkha slashes the legionnaire twice across the face. The legionnaire goes in for a thrust attack in desperation, but the Gurkha grabs his arm and stops him. He then swings his knife, slashing through the legionnaire's throat.  As the legionnaire lies on the ground drawing his last breath, the Gurkha raises his arms and bloodied kukri into the air, shouting "Ayo Gurkhali!" (The Gurkhas are here!) in victory.

Winner: Gurkhas

Episode 32: Vampires vs. Zombies

Vampire Team: Steve Niles (Screenwriter, 30 Days of Night), Scott Bowen (Author, The Vampire Survival Guide)
Vampire "Weapons": Bite, Claws

Zombie Team: Max Brooks (Author, World War Z), Matt Mogk (Founder, Zombie Research Society)
Zombie "Weapons": Bite, Hands

This is the only episode to feature fictional entities, as well as the only episode to not use weapons (the warriors themselves are the weapons).
Featured are the 30 Days of Night apex predator vampires and the Night of the Living Dead slow moving zombies; clips of both films were seen multiple times throughout the episode.
The established rules used in this episode are that the zombie virus has the potential to spread to a vampire, sunlight will affect the vampires, the vampires can only be killed by removing/destroying its head or heart or by bleeding out, and the zombies can only be killed by destroying the brain.
To determine how many zombies a vampire could kill before getting overrun, Leif Becker, expert martial artist and world champion speed board breaker, tested metal claw gauntlets designed by Dave Baker to simulate a vampire's razor-sharp claws. He was surrounded by 12 zombie dummies on pulleys, and ripped apart 9 out of the 12 zombies targets.  Multiplied by 6 (to simulate the Vampire's superior strength and speed), that would be 54 zombies killed out of 72, with an average of 63, resulting in the ratio of zombies to vampires (63 to 1).
For close range, in order to get a baseline pressure reading, the zombie bite was simulated by a 100 lb rottweiler, named "Joey", that bit down on a load cell hidden in an attack sleeve which resulted in 255 lbs of pressure. For the vampire bite, an alligator, named "Ripper", was brought in to chomp down on a 10 lb load cell between two blocks, which resulted in 1,723 lbs of bite force. Then the forces were feed into an automated chomper designed by Geoff, changing the bite force and teeth for each creature. The zombie teeth killed a simulated vampire through bleed-out in 2:22, and the vampire teeth destroyed a zombie brain in 5 seconds.
For mid range, the Vampire claw was matched against a horde of Zombie hands. For the Zombie hands, three world-class strongmen were blindfolded (to simulate the Zombies' random attack pattern) and instructed to rip at a ballistic gel torso until they removed the heart, killing the vampire in 58 seconds. To test the Vampire claw, one of the aforementioned strongmen slammed down on a pressure mat, the force generated was multiplied by 6 (to simulate the Vampire's super strength), generating a slash force with 8,820 lbs behind it, enough to penetrate a zombie gel head, destroying its brain and killing it in 1.07 seconds.
This is the third episode with no long range weapons.
This is the only episode of season 3 where the least effective weapon was not in the same class as the most effective weapon.
For X-Factors, the Zombies had both the lowest and highest known scores of season 3, having a 9 in Intelligence and a perfect 100 in Endurance (the only known 100 in the show's history).
This is the only episode to have no edges given, and also has the fewest "weapons" tested, a total of 4 (compared to season 3's average of 6 weapons, season 2's average of 8 weapons, and season 1's range of 8 to 12 weapons.)
This is the first simulated battle where one team has a numerical advantage (3 Vampires vs. 189 Zombies), the first to have a granular appearance (so as to create the classic horror film look), the second to have kills with unlisted techniques (the vampires throw and stomp zombies to death), the second to use slow motion, and the third to have a female play a role.  It is also the longest running battle of the show, clocking at 3:36.
The male vampire who dies first has the highest body count of the show, killing 78 zombies by himself.
The vampires are the only warriors to outperform their opponents in every weapon category, but the Zombies outperformed the Vampires in X-Factors.
This is the only episode to end in a cliffhanger. Although the vampires won in the simulation, the head vampire was shown succumbing to the effects of the zombie virus at the end of the show (stemming from his earlier exposure to zombie fluids), ending in the words "to be continued."
This is the final episode before the show's cancellation.

Reenactment 32

The battle begins at night inside an abandoned warehouse, where 189 zombies are searching for a food source. Somewhere inside the warehouse, 3 vampires rise from their resting coffins ready to feast. The lead vampire communicates to his comrades in hisses and growls, ordering them to split up. In a hallway, the male subordinate vampire rakes his claws on a wall. He uses his heightened senses to sniff out his prey and dashes down a corridor, jumping up a railed stairway until he comes to a wooden door. He puts his ear up next to the door listening for any commotion. A zombie suddenly smashes the door, startling the vampire. As the zombies begin to pour through the doorway, the vampire regains his wits and puts his claws to work, slashing and swiping 2 zombies who come through the door. He soon is overwhelmed and runs back to the corridor where the rest of the zombies have begun to come through the other exits, blocking all paths of escape. He goes to work again, using his claws to take down 76 zombies before being completely engulfed by the zombie horde. The zombies grab and begin to hold down the fatigued vampire as he calls for help. The female vampire and the lead vampire answer the male's cries, but are too late to help their friend, and look on in horror as the zombies hold him down and disembowel him. The lead vampire hisses to the female to run for it and they take off down a hallway with a door. As the lead opens the door, they are greeted by another horde of zombies. He bites the first zombie in the doorway in the top of the skull and shuts the door, holding it down along with the female vampire, who locks it behind them. The both of them take off down the way they came as the horde smashes through the door and shambles on through. The vampire duo soon arrives back to where the first horde came in and both begin to massacre the zombies, taking down 58 of them. Eventually, the female vampire is attacked from behind as a zombie bites through her neck, breaking her jugular vein. She throws the offending zombie at the wall and stomps another one dead before dying of blood loss herself, leaving the leader to fight 50 zombies on his own. The lead vampire continues to fight, killing 6 zombies as fatigue begins to set in. As he slows down, he is swarmed from all sides by zombies that try to hold him down. The vampire throws them all off, killing 4 and rakes a fifth across the face before it can get any closer. Out of breath, the lead vampire attempts to leave through an exit door, but retreats back inside as he sees the dawn breaking in front of him. The vampire comes face-to-face with the remaining 39 zombies, killing them one by one. He then punches the last one in the face and throws it against a wall, killing it. The vampire looks around to make sure all the zombies are dead, then raises his hand and roars in victory, which moments later turns to shock as he has been infected from the zombie he had bitten earlier in the battle begins to turn him into a zombie-vampire hybrid. The ending is left ambiguous.

Winner: Vampires

See also

 Deadliest Warrior (season 1)
 Deadliest Warrior (season 2)

References

External links

2011 American television seasons
Cultural depictions of George Washington
Cultural depictions of Napoleon
Depictions of Genghis Khan on television
Cultural depictions of Saddam Hussein
Cultural depictions of Ivan the Terrible
Cultural depictions of Theodore Roosevelt
Cultural depictions of T. E. Lawrence
Cultural depictions of Joan of Arc
Cultural depictions of Pancho Villa
Cultural depictions of Hernán Cortés
Cultural depictions of Crazy Horse